Savarese is a surname of Italian origin, and may refer to:

People
Ugo Savarese (1912–1997), Italian operatic baritone
Sergio Savarese (1958–2006), Italian furniture designer

Julia Savarese (b. 1926), American writer
Tom Savarese (1944), American DJ
Lou Savarese (1965), American professional boxer
Donna Savarese (1967), American television news anchor
George Savarese (1967/1968), American television commentator, radio journalist, and teacher
Jill Gray Savarese (1969), American actor
Giovanni Savarese (1970), Venezuelan professional football player and coach

Other
Savarese, a comic by Robin Wood and Domingo Roberto Mandrafina